Mantovano is an Italian surname. Notable people with the surname include:

 Battista Mantovano (1447–1516), Italian Carmelite reformer, humanist, and poet
 Francesco Mantovano or Francesco Caldei (1587/88 – 22 May 1674), Italian still life painter
 Rossino Mantovano (16th century), Italian composer

See also
 Mantovani (surname)

Italian-language surnames